Alucita abenahoensis is a moth in the family Alucitidae. It is found in Irian Jaya, Indonesia.

References

 , 2009: Additions to the Alucitidae of Papua, Indonesia (Lepidoptera). Boletin Sociedad Entomologica Aragonesa 44: 15–33.

Moths described in 2009
Alucitidae
Moths of Indonesia